In mathematics, the Bing–Borsuk conjecture states that every -dimensional homogeneous absolute neighborhood retract space is a topological manifold. The conjecture has been proved for dimensions 1 and 2, and it is known that the 3-dimensional version of the conjecture implies the Poincaré conjecture.

Definitions

If  has a mapping cylinder neighbourhood  of some map  with mapping cylinder projection , then  is an approximate fibration.

History

Włodzimierz Jakobsche showed in 1978 that, if the Bing–Borsuk conjecture is true in dimension 3, then the Poincaré conjecture must also be true.

The Busemann conjecture states that every Busemann -space is a topological manifold. It is a special case of the Bing–Borsuk conjecture. The Busemann conjecture is known to be true for dimensions 1 to 4.

References

Topology
Conjectures
Unsolved problems in mathematics
Manifolds